|}

The Temple Stakes is a Group 2 flat horse race in Great Britain open to horses aged three years or older. It is run at Haydock Park over a distance of 5 furlongs (1,006 metres), and it is scheduled to take place each year in May.

The event was established in 1965, and it was originally held at Sandown Park. It was transferred to its present venue in 2008.

The leading horses from the Temple Stakes often go on to compete in the King's Stand Stakes. The last to win both races in the same year was Profitable in 2016.

Records
Most successful horse (2 wins):
 Mind Games – 1995, 1996
 Kingsgate Native - 2010, 2013
 Battaash - 2018, 2019

Leading jockey (4 wins):
 Lester Piggott – Falcon (1967), Raffingora (1970), Shoolerville (1972), Fearless Lad (1983)
 Walter Swinburn – Petorius (1984, dead-heat), Treasure Kay (1987), Dancing Dissident (1989), Elbio (1991)

Leading trainer (5 wins):
 Sir Michael Stoute – Blue Cashmere (1975), Petorius (1984, dead-heat), Dancing Dissident (1989), Snaadee (1992), Kingsgate Native (2010)

Winners since 1980

Earlier winners

 1965: Holborn
 1966: Polyfoto
 1967: Falcon
 1968: D'Urberville
 1969: Song
 1970: Raffingora
 1971: Mummy's Pet
 1972: Shoolerville
 1973: Saulingo
 1974: Bay Express
 1975: Blue Cashmere
 1976: Lochnager
 1977: Vilgora
 1978: Oscilight / Smarten Up

See also
 Horse racing in Great Britain
 List of British flat horse races

References

 Paris-Turf:
 Racing Post:

 galopp-sieger.de – Temple Stakes.
 ifhaonline.org – International Federation of Horseracing Authorities – Temple Stakes (2019).
 pedigreequery.com – Temple Stakes.
 

Flat races in Great Britain
Haydock Park Racecourse
Open sprint category horse races
Recurring sporting events established in 1965
British Champions Series
1965 establishments in England